Phạm Minh Đức (born on May 5, 1976) is a Vietnamese football coach and former player who currently serves as the head coach of Hồng Lĩnh Hà Tĩnh in V.League 2.

Pham Minh Duc played for the Vietnam national football team at the 2002 AFF Championship.

References

External links 
Bio

1976 births
Living people
Vietnamese footballers
Viettel FC players
Hanoi FC players
Becamex Binh Duong FC players
V.League 1 players
Hoang Anh Gia Lai FC players
Vietnam international footballers
Association football defenders